"Do Without My Love" is a single from British R&B singer Nathan taken from his debut album Masterpiece. The single was released on 12 March 2007 as a Digital download in the United Kingdom. The song peaked at number 44 on the UK Singles Chart.

Music video
A music video to accompany the release of "Do Without My Love" was first released onto YouTube on 5 December 2006 at a total length of three minutes and fifty-six seconds.

Track listing

Chart performance

Release history

References

2006 songs
2007 singles